The men's Greco-Roman featherweight was a Greco-Roman wrestling event held as part of the Wrestling at the 1920 Summer Olympics programme. It was the second appearance of the event. Featherweight was the lightest category, including wrestlers weighing up to 60 kilograms.

A total of 21 wrestlers from 12 nations competed in the event, which was held from August 16 to August 20, 1920.

Results

Gold medal round

Silver medal round

Bronze medal round

References

Notes
 
 

Wrestling at the 1920 Summer Olympics
Greco-Roman wrestling